"Gimme Shelter" is a song by English rock band the Rolling Stones. Released as the opening track from band's 1969 album Let It Bleed. The song covers topics of war, murder, rape and fear. It features prominent guest vocals by American singer Merry Clayton.

American author, music journalist and cultural critic Greil Marcus, writing for Rolling Stone magazine at the time of its release, praised the song, stating that the band has "never done anything better". "Gimme Shelter" has placed in various positions on many "best of/greatest" lists including that of Rolling Stone magazine. In 2021 "Gimme Shelter" was ranked at number 13 on Rolling Stones list of the "500 Greatest Songs of All Time".

Inspiration and recording
"Gimme Shelter" was written by the Rolling Stones' lead vocalist Mick Jagger and guitarist Keith Richards, the band's primary songwriting team. Richards began working on the song's signature opening riff in London while Jagger was away filming Performance with Richards' then-girlfriend, Anita Pallenberg.  In his autobiography Life, Richards revealed that the tension of the song was inspired by his jealousy at seeing the relationship between Pallenberg and Jagger, and his suspicions of an affair between them.

As released, the song begins with Richards performing a guitar intro, soon joined by Jagger's lead vocal. Of Let It Bleeds bleak world view, Jagger said in a 1995 interview with Rolling Stone magazine:

Similarly, on NPR in 2012: 

The song's inspiration was not initially Vietnam or social unrest, however, but Richards seeing people scurrying for shelter from a sudden rain storm.  According to him:

The recording features guest vocals by Merry Clayton, recorded at a last-minute late-night recording session in Los Angeles during the mixing phase, arranged by her friend and record producer Jack Nitzsche. After the first verse is sung by Jagger, Clayton enters and they share the next three verses. A harmonica solo by Jagger and guitar solo by Richards follow. Then, with great energy, Clayton repeatedly sings "Rape, murder! It's just a shot away! It's just a shot away!", almost screaming the final stanza. She and Jagger then repeat the line "It's just a shot away" and finish with repeats of "It's just a kiss away". When speaking of her inclusion in the recording, Jagger stated in the 2003 book According to the Rolling Stones that the Rolling Stones' producer Jimmy Miller thought of having a female singer on the track and told fellow producer Nitzsche to contact one: "The use of the female voice was the producer's idea. It would be one of those moments along the lines of 'I hear a girl on this track – get one on the phone.  Summoned from bed around midnight by Nitzsche, Clayton – about four months pregnant – made her recording with just a few takes and then returned home to bed. It remains the most prominent contribution to a Rolling Stones track by a female vocalist.

At about 2:59 into the song, Clayton's voice cracks under the strain; once during the second refrain on the word "shot", then on the word "murder" during the third refrain, after which Jagger is faintly heard exclaiming "Woo!" in response to Clayton's powerful delivery. Upon returning home, Clayton suffered a miscarriage, attributed by some sources to her exertions during the recording.

Merry Clayton's name was erroneously written on the original release, appearing as "Mary". Her name is also listed as "Mary" on the 2002 Let It Bleed remastered CD.

The song was recorded in London at Olympic Studios in February and March 1969; the vocals were recorded in Los Angeles at Sunset Sound Recorders and Elektra Studios in October and November that same year. Nicky Hopkins played piano, Jimmy Miller played percussion, Charlie Watts played drums, Bill Wyman played bass, Jagger played harmonica and sang backup vocals with Richards and Clayton. Guitarist Brian Jones was present during the early sessions but did not contribute, Richards being credited with both rhythm and lead guitars on the album sleeve. For the recording, Richards used an Australian-made Maton SE777, a large single-cutaway hollowbody guitar, which he had previously used on "Midnight Rambler". The guitar barely survived the recording before literally falling apart. "[O]n the very last note of 'Gimmie Shelter, Richards told Guitar World in 2002, "the whole neck fell off. You can hear it on the original take."

Releases on compilation albums and live recordings
"Gimme Shelter" quickly became a staple of the Rolling Stones' live shows. It was first performed sporadically during their 1969 American Tour and became a regular addition to their setlist during the 1972 American Tour. Other concert versions appear on the Stones' albums No Security (recorded 1997, released 1998), Live Licks (recorded 2003, released 2004), Brussels Affair (recorded 1973, released 2011), and Hyde Park Live (2013). A May 1995 performance recorded at Paradiso (Amsterdam) was released on the 1996 "Wild Horses" (live) single, on the 1998 "Saint of Me" single (included in the 45-CD 2011 box set The Singles 1971–2006), and again on Totally Stripped in 2016.

The song appeared in Ladies and Gentlemen: The Rolling Stones, a film of the Stones' 1972 North American Tour, as well as on its 2010 official DVD release. It is also featured on the concert DVD/Blu-ray sets Bridges to Babylon Tour '97–98 (1998), Four Flicks (2003), The Biggest Bang (2007), Sweet Summer Sun: Hyde Park Live (2013), Totally Stripped (2016), and Havana Moon (2016).

The female contributor to the live version of the song is Lisa Fischer, the only woman to appear in all their tours since 1989.

In their 2012 50th anniversary tour, the Rolling Stones sang this song with Mary J. Blige, Florence Welch, and Lady Gaga.

"Gimme Shelter" was never released as a single. Nevertheless, it has been included on many compilation releases, including Gimme Shelter, Hot Rocks 1964–1971, Forty Licks, and GRRR! In 2023, a version of the song, featuring Lady Gaga, was also included on their 50th-anniversary live tour album, GRRR Live! – Live at Newark.

Personnel

According to authors Philippe Margotin and Jean-Michel Guesdon:The Rolling StonesMick Jagger lead vocals, harmonica
Keith Richards backing vocals, lead and rhythm guitars
Bill Wyman bass
Charlie Watts drumsAdditional personnelMerry Clayton lead and backing vocals
Nicky Hopkins piano
Jimmy Miller güiro, maracas

Accolades
Greil Marcus, writing for Rolling Stone magazine at the time of the "Gimme Shelters release, stated that "[t]he Stones have never done anything better".  Pitchfork placed it at number 12 on its list of "The 200 Greatest Songs of the 1960s". Ultimate Classic Rock put the song at number one on their Top 100 Rolling Stones songs and number three on their Top 100 Classic Rock Songs.

It is ranked number 13 on [[Rolling Stone's 500 Greatest Songs of All Time|''Rolling Stones 500 Greatest Songs of All Time]] list.  It is also ranked number 1 on the magazine's list of the band's best songs. According to Acclaimed Music, it is the 34th most celebrated song in popular music history.

In popular culture
"Gimme Shelter" has been featured in a variety of films, television shows, and commercials. The 1970 documentary film Gimme Shelter, directed by Albert and David Maysles and Charlotte Zwerin, chronicling the last weeks of the Stones' 1969 US tour and culminating in the disastrous Altamont Free Concert, took its name from the song. A live version of the song played over the documentary's credits. The song has appeared in three Martin Scorsese films.

French filmmaker Michel Gondry directed a video using the song as musical backing, which was released in 1998. The video features a sixteen-year old Brad Renfro, playing a young man escaping with his brother from a dysfunctional home and the abuse they suffered at the hands of their abusive alcoholic father, and then from society as a whole.

 Certifications 

Notable cover versions
Merry Clayton, who performed with Mick Jagger on the Rolling Stones version of the song (see above), released a cover of "Gimme Shelter" in 1970 on her first solo album, also titled Gimme Shelter.
American rock band Grand Funk Railroad covered and included it on their fourth studio album, Survival'' (1971). It was released as a single and reached 61 on the Billboard Hot 100 chart. 
U2 covered the song at the Rock and Roll Hall of Fame benefit concert on 30 October 2009, with Mick Jagger sharing lead vocals with Bono and featuring the Black Eyed Peas members Fergie, singing Merry Clayton's vocal part, and will.i.am, playing piano and synthesizer.
Paolo Nutini covered the song and was asked by Mick Jagger and Ben Affleck to perform the track for a documentary of the same name on the plight of the millions of people displaced from their homes as a result of fighting in the Sudanese region.

"Putting Our House in Order" project
In 1993, a Food Records project collected various versions of the track by the following bands and collaborations, the proceeds of which went to the Shelter charity's "Putting Our House in Order" homeless initiative. The versions were issued across various formats, and had a live version of the song by the Rolling Stones as a common lead track to ensure chart eligibility.

"Gimme Shelter" (pop version – cassette single)
Voice of the Beehive and Jimmy Somerville
Heaven 17 with Hannah Jones

"Gimme Shelter" (alternative version – CD single)
New Model Army and Tom Jones
Cud and Sandie Shaw
Kingmaker

"Gimme Shelter" (rock version – CD single)
Thunder
Little Angels
Hawkwind and Samantha Fox

"Gimme Shelter" (dance version – 12" single)
808 State and Robert Owens 	
Pop Will Eat Itself vs Gary Clail vs Ranking Roger vs the Mighty Diamonds vs the On U Sound System
Blue Pearl (produced and mixed by Utah Saints)

References
Informational notes

Citations

Bibliography

External links
Gimme Shelter (Official lyric video) on YouTube

1969 songs
1971 singles
2007 singles
Grand Funk Railroad songs
Joss Stone songs
Patti Smith songs
Songs written by Jagger–Richards
Songs of the Vietnam War
The Rolling Stones songs
Samantha Fox songs
Song recordings produced by Jimmy Miller
Songs about crime
Songs about depression
Songs about weather
Songs about sexual assault
Capitol Records singles
Columbia Records singles
Music videos directed by Michel Gondry